Loch Bà is a freshwater loch, about 5 km long, in the centre of the Isle of Mull, in Scotland. It is drained by the River Bà, flowing into Loch na Keal, a sea loch on the west of Mull.

References

Ba
Ba
Isle of Mull